The Office of the United Nations Special Coordinator for Lebanon is the political office of the United Nations that organizes the work of the UN in Lebanon. The Special Coordinator for Lebanon is the Secretary-General's representative to the Lebanese Government, as well as to all political parties and the broader diplomatic community hosted in the country. It has offices located in Yarze, three minutes from Beirut.

Leadership
Source:
Geir Otto Pedersen: (2007–2008)
Michael Williams (2008–2012)
Derek Plumbly (2012–2015)
Sigrid Kaag (2015–2017)
Pernille Dahler Kardel (2017–2019) (Acting)
Ján Kubiš (2019–2021)
Joanna Wronecka (2021–present)

Deputy
Najat Rochdi: (2020–present)

References

External links
 Office of the United Nations Special Coordinator for Lebanon Website

Foreign relations of Lebanon
United Nations operations in Asia
Lebanon and the United Nations